Justin Dhillon (born June 6, 1995) is an American professional soccer player who currently plays for USL Championship club San Antonio FC.

Career
Dhillon began his career with the LA Galaxy Academy team where he led the Under 16 academy to win the USSDA National Championship for the first time in club history scoring 24 goals in 2011. In his three years with the academy, Dhillon scored an impressive 72 goals in all competitions. During this time Dhillon also appeared for the United States Under 18 Men's National Team. Following this, Dhillon played four years of college soccer at California Polytechnic State University between 2013 and 2016. While at Cal Poly, Dhillon appeared for PSA Elite and USL PDL side FC Golden State Force.

On January 13, 2017, Dhillon signed a professional contract with LA Galaxy II, a USL affiliate club of LA Galaxy.

On March 15, 2019, Dhillon joined USL side Tacoma Defiance. He acted as a leader for the Tacoma Defiance, providing a bigger target up front than the squad had been used to. On May 21, 2019, he scored the fastest goal in USL history, scoring in just 9.17 seconds. Seattle Sounders FC added him to their first team roster on June 28, 2019 to help bolster the roster after the injury of Will Bruin.

On January 15, 2021, it was announced that Dhillon had signed with USL Championship side San Antonio FC for the 2021 season.

Honors

Seattle Sounders FC
 MLS Cup: 2019

References

External links
 
Cal Poly Mustangs bio
LA Galaxy bio

1995 births
Living people
American soccer players
Association football forwards
Cal Poly Mustangs men's soccer players
FC Golden State Force players
LA Galaxy II players
People from Rancho Santa Margarita, California
Seattle Sounders FC players
San Antonio FC players
Soccer players from California
Sportspeople from Orange County, California
Tacoma Defiance players
USL Championship players
USL League Two players
Major League Soccer players
Homegrown Players (MLS)